The New York Film Critics Circle Award for Best Actress is one of the awards given by the New York Film Critics Circle to honor the finest achievements in film-making.

Winners

1930s

1940s

1950s

1960s

1970s

1980s

1990s

2000s

2010s

2020s

Multiple awards

4 wins
Meryl Streep (1982, 1988, 2009, 2011)

3 wins
 Ingrid Bergman (1945, 1956, 1978)
 Julie Christie (1965, 1997, 2007)
 Deborah Kerr (1947, 1957, 1960)
 Sissy Spacek (1980, 1986, 2001)
 Liv Ullmann (1972, 1974, 1976)
 Joanne Woodward (1968, 1973, 1990)

2 wins
 Cate Blanchett (2013, 2022)
 Olivia de Havilland (1948, 1949)
 Jane Fonda (1969, 1971)
 Greta Garbo (1935, 1937)
 Audrey Hepburn (1953, 1959)
 Holly Hunter (1987, 1993)
 Glenda Jackson (1970, 1981)
 Vivien Leigh (1939, 1951)
 Saoirse Ronan (2015, 2017)

See also
 Academy Award for Best Actress
 National Board of Review Award for Best Actress
 National Society of Film Critics Award for Best Actress
 Los Angeles Film Critics Association Award for Best Actress

References

External links
 nyfcc.com

Film awards for lead actress
New York Film Critics Circle Awards